Danil Marselevich Sadreev (born 7 May 2003) is a Tatar Russian ski jumper. He competed in the 2022 Winter Olympics. 

Sadreev finished just off the podium in fourth at the 2020 Winter Youth Olympic Games, just 1.1 points shy of the bronze medal. He also competed in the cross-country skiing/ski jumping/Nordic combined team event, finishing ninth.

References

External links

2003 births
Living people
Russian male ski jumpers
Olympic ski jumpers of Russia
Ski jumpers at the 2022 Winter Olympics
Sportspeople from Tatarstan
Ski jumpers at the 2020 Winter Youth Olympics
Olympic silver medalists for the Russian Olympic Committee athletes
Medalists at the 2022 Winter Olympics
Olympic medalists in ski jumping